Johan Willem Friso Wielenga (born 1956) is a Dutch contemporary historian.

Life and career 
Born in Rotterdam, Wielenga studied history and politics at the Vrije Universiteit Amsterdam from 1975 to 1978 and in 1982/1983 with a German Academic Exchange Service scholarship at the Rheinische Friedrich-Wilhelms-Universität Bonn. He received his Doctorate in 1989. He then taught International relations at the University of Groningen and from 1990 Political history at the Utrecht University. In 1992, he became associate professor of German Contemporary history and Dutch-German relations at the University of Groningen and in 1997 associate professor of German contemporary history at the University of Utrecht. 

He works as a journalist for the Dutch daily newspapers de Volkskrant and NRC Handelsblad.

In 2015, he was awarded the Bundesverdienstkreuz am Bande for his services to German-Dutch relations.

Publications 
 West-Duitsland. Partner uit noodzaak. Nederland an de Bondsrepubliek 1949–1955. Het Spectrum, Utrecht 1989, .
 Schaduwen van de Duitse geschiedenis. De omgamg met het nazi- en DDR-verleden in de Bondsrepubliek Duitsland. Boom, Amsterdam 1993, .German edition: Schatten deutscher Geschichte. Der Umgang mit dem Nationalsozialismus und der DDR-Vergangenheit in der Bundesrepublik. Translated from Dutch by Christoph Strupp. SH, Vierow bei Greifswald 1995, .
 Vom Feind zum Partner. Die Niederlande und Deutschland seit 1945. With a foreword by Wolfgang Clement. (Original title Van vijand tot bondgenoot.) Translated from Dutch by Christoph Strupp and Anne Wielenga-Flohr. Agenda, Münster 2000, .
 with Ilona Riek: Niederlande- und Belgienforschung in der Bundesrepublik Deutschland. Waxmann, Münster/New York/Munich/Berlin 2003, .
 Die Niederlande. Politik und politische Kultur im 20. Jahrhundert. Waxmann, Münster/New York/München/Berlin 2008, .Niederländische Ausgabe: Nederland in de twintigste eeuw. Boom, Amsterdam 2009, .
 Geschichte der Niederlande. Translated from Dutch by Annegret Klinzmann. Reclam, Stuttgart 2012, .

References

External links 
 
 Friso Wielenga on the website of the University of Münster
 Friso Wielenga im FID Benelux-Forschungsverzeichnis

20th-century Dutch historians
Academic staff of the University of Groningen
Academic staff of Utrecht University
Academic staff of the University of Münster
Recipients of the Cross of the Order of Merit of the Federal Republic of Germany
1956 births
Living people
Writers from Rotterdam
21st-century Dutch historians